Britt Baron (born October 16, 1991) is an American actress, best known for her role as Justine in GLOW, an American comedy-drama streaming television wrestling series on Netflix and as Tifa Lockhart in Final Fantasy VII Remake.

Early life
Britt Baron was born Brittany Noelle Uomoleale in White Plains, New York and grew up in Westport, Connecticut. She graduated in Performance Arts at the University of Michigan in 2013.

Career
Baron has worked as a voice over, film, and theatre actress. She starred in East of Eden and Grand Concourse at Steppenwolf Theatre in Chicago.

Filmography

Film

Television

Video games

Audio books

References

External links

1991 births
Living people
American film actresses
American stage actresses
American television actresses
American video game actresses
American voice actresses
People from White Plains, New York
People from Westport, Connecticut
University of Michigan School of Music, Theatre & Dance alumni
Actresses from New York (state)
Actresses from Connecticut
21st-century American actresses